Qinghuayuan Subdistrict is a subdistrict of Haidian District, Beijing, It shares border with Dongsheng Town in the northeast, Xueyuan Road Subdistrict in the east, Yanyuan and Zhongguancun Subdistricts in the south, and Qinglongqiao Subdistrict in the northwest. As of 2020, it had a population of 56,592 under its administration.

"Qinghuayuan" means Tsinghua (University) Garden, referring to the fact it covers much of Tsinghua's campus, and the subdistrict is therefore administered jointly by Haidian District and university officials.

History

Administrative Divisions 
As of 2021, Qinghuayuan Subdistrict was subdivided into 10 residential communities, all of which are listed below:

See also
List of township-level divisions of Beijing

References 

Haidian District
Subdistricts of Beijing